Display may refer to:

Technology
 Display device, output device for presenting information, including:
 Cathode ray tube, video display that provides a quality picture, but can be very heavy and deep
 Electronic visual display, output device to present information for visual or tactile reception
 Flat-panel display, video display that is much lighter and thinner than deeper, usually older types
 Liquid-crystal display (LCD), displays that use liquid crystals to form images
 Liquid crystal display television (LCD TV), color TVs that use an LCD to form images
 Light-emitting diode (LED), emitting light when electrically charged, producing electroluminescence
 Stereo display, a display device able to convey image depth to a viewer
 Volumetric display, forms a visual representation of an object in three physical dimensions
 Refreshable braille display, electromechanical device to display braille characters
 Split-flap display,  electromechanical alphanumeric device, often used as a public transport timetable in airports or railway stations
 Flip-disc display, electromechanical dot matrix technology used for large outdoor signs
 Video card, also known as "display card", an expansion card that generates images to display device
 Display list, series of graphics commands that define an output image
 Display register or data structure, for locating the stack frames of nested functions in computer programming
 Display resolution, refers to the number of distinct pixels of a digital TV or monitor

Marketing
 Display advertising, type that typically contains text, i.e., copy, logos, images, location maps, etc.
 Display case, also termed a showcase or display cabinet, used to display objects for viewing
 Display window, usually in a shop to display items for sale or attract customers
 Point of sale display, material object for promotion and/or providing information, i.e., in a shop or movie theater for a film promotion, etc. 
 Trade show display, the physical screens, banners and other paraphernalia used to fill a temporary exhibit space at a trade fair

Biology
 Display (zoology), a form of animal behaviour
 Display (horse) (1923–1944), US thoroughbred racehorse
 Display techniques in biochemistry:
 Bacterial display
 mRNA display
 Phage display
 Ribosome display
 Yeast display

See also
 
 Computer font or display font, for use on a computer monitor
 Computer monitor or display